Cedric Boswell (born July 21, 1969) is an American professional boxer. He was touted as a future heavyweight contender early in his pro career, which began in 1994.

As an amateur, he defeated Shannon Briggs on points at the National Golden Gloves quarterfinals.

Known as "The Bos", Boswell began his professional career with 21 straight wins, blasting out limited opposition to set up a fight against Jameel McCline in 2003. McCline won via TKO in the 10th, and Boswell didn't fight again until 2006.

Boswell fought undefeated (27-0) Roman Greenberg in August 2008, and won via a shocking 2nd-round TKO.

As of July 2009, he was 30-1 and ranked 38th in the International Boxing Organization's heavyweight computerized rankings. He also ranked 14th in the United States in the heavyweight division.

On December 3, 2011, Boswell lost to Alexander Povetkin for the WBA (regular) title. The fight took place at Hartwall Arena, Helsinki, Finland.

Professional boxing record

References

1969 births
Living people
African-American boxers
Boxers from Detroit
Heavyweight boxers
American male boxers
21st-century African-American people
20th-century African-American sportspeople